Sergestidae is a family of prawns which have lived since at least the Middle Jurassic (Bajocian/Bathonian). It contains the following genera:
Acetes H. Milne-Edwards, 1830
Allosergestes Judkins & Kensley, 2008
Casertanus Bravi et al., 2014 †
Cretasergestes Garassino & Schweigert, 2006 †
Deosergestes Judkins & Kensley, 2008
Eusergestes Judkins & Kensley, 2008
Neosergestes Judkins & Kensley, 2008
Paleomattea Maisey & G. P. de Carvalho, 1995 †
Parasergestes Judkins & Kensley, 2008
Sergestes H. Milne-Edwards, 1830
Sergia Stimpson, 1860
Sicyonella Borradaile, 1910

References

Dendrobranchiata
Decapod families